Îles de la Madeleine, Îles-de-la-Madeleine, Iles de la Madeleine or Les Îles-de-la-Madeleine may refer to:

 Magdalen Islands (French: les Îles de la Madeleine) in Canada 
 Les Îles-de-la-Madeleine, Quebec, municipality of Magdalen Islands
 Îles-de-la-Madeleine (electoral district)
 Îles-de-la-Madeleine (provincial electoral district)
 Îles-de-la-Madeleine Airport
 Les Îles-de-la-Madeleine Regional County Municipality
 Urban agglomeration of Les Îles-de-la-Madeleine
 Gaspésie–Îles-de-la-Madeleine, administrative region of Quebec, Canada
 Gaspésie—Les Îles-de-la-Madeleine, federal electoral district in Quebec, Canada
 Bonaventure—Gaspé—Îles-de-la-Madeleine—Pabok, former electoral district in Quebec
 Bonaventure—Îles-de-la-Madeleine, former electoral district in Quebec

 Îles de la Madeleine (Senegal), uninhabited islands off the shore of Dakar

See also 

 Cap-de-la-Madeleine